My Acoustic Diary is the eleventh studio album by Australian recording artist Adam Brand. The album sees Brand perform acoustic reinterpretations of 13 songs from his career spanning from 1998 to 2013 and two new tracks.
It was released on 8 November 2013 and peaked at number 31 on the ARIA charts.

Background
In 2013, Brand signed with a new record label, ABC Music, with Brand saying "I felt like it was a time to start a new chapter in my life, a bit of a fresh start." In August 2013, Brand told Gympie Times his next album would be an acoustic one. Brand said "I'm going to be going through all the songs from my very first album right up to the recent one. There are some songs there that are quite pivotal, even though it may not have been a single or a hit, but for me it meant something." Brand added the album will reflect the early forms many of his songs had as he wrote them. "Most of them were written on a couch in someone's lounge room. I definitely want it to be that kind or organic feeling, just like we're sitting around with a cuppa in the lounge room, probably in our jammies."

Reception

Ben Ryan from Renowned for Sound said "To say that most tracks on My Acoustic Diary are simply re-recorded versions of the old stuff is an oversimplification. Instead, the tunes have been redone acoustically, or in a broken down form at least, giving them new life and new character." adding "Adam Brand has remained faithful to his work, and loyal to his listeners, presenting versions that are just as, if not more, appealing than the originals."

Track listing

Charts

Weekly charts

Year-end charts

Release history

References

2013 albums
Adam Brand (musician) albums